Claire Keegan (born 1968) is an Irish writer known for her short stories, which have been published in The New Yorker, Best American Short Stories, Granta, and The Paris Review.

Biography
Born in County Wicklow in 1968, Keegan is the youngest of a large Roman Catholic family. She traveled to New Orleans, Louisiana when she was 17 and studied English and political science at Loyola University. She returned to Ireland in 1992, and later lived for a year in Cardiff, Wales, where she undertook an MA in creative writing and taught undergraduates at the University of Wales. She subsequently received an M.Phil at Trinity College Dublin.

Keegan's first collection of short stories, Antarctica (1999), won the Rooney Prize for Irish Literature and the William Trevor Prize. Her second collection of short stories, Walk the Blue Fields, was published in 2007. Keegan's 'long, short story' Foster won the 2009 Davy Byrnes Short Story Award. Foster appeared in the 15 February 2010 issue of New Yorker; it was later published by Faber and Faber in longer form. Foster is now included as a text for the Irish Leaving Certificate. Foster was adapted for film in 2021 and released as the An Cailín Ciúin (The Quiet Girl) in May 2022. 

In late 2021, Keegan published a novella, Small Things Like These, set in Ireland in the mid-1980s. It was shortlisted for the 2022 Booker Prize.

Keegan lives in rural Ireland.

Works
 1999 – Antarctica
 2007 – Walk the Blue Fields
 2010 – Foster
 2021 - Small Things Like These

Awards and honours
Keegan has won the inaugural William Trevor Prize, the Rooney Prize for Irish Literature, the Olive Cook Award and the Davy Byrnes Irish Writing Award 2009. Other awards include the Hugh Leonard Bursary, the Macaulay Fellowship, the Martin Healy Prize, the Kilkenny Prize and the Tom Gallon Award. She was also a 2002 Wingate Scholar and a two-time recipient of the Francis MacManus Award. She was a visiting professor at Villanova University in 2008. Keegan was the Ireland Fund Artist-in-Residence in the Celtic Studies Department of St. Michael's College at the University of Toronto in March 2009. In 2019, she was appointed as Writing Fellow at Trinity College Dublin. Pembroke College Cambridge and Trinity College Dublin selected Keegan as the 2021 Briena Staunton Visiting Fellow. 
The French translation of Small Things Like These (Ce genre de petites choses) has been shortlisted for two prestigious awards: the Francophonie Ambassadors' Literary Award and the Grand Prix de L'Heroine Madame Figaro.
In March 2021, Claire and her French translator, Jacqueline Odin, won the Francophonie Ambassadors' Literary Award. Small Things Like These won the 2022 Orwell Prize for Political Fiction. It was also shortlisted for the 2022 Booker Prize and is the shortest book recognized in the history of the prize. 

Claire has been a member of Aosdána since 2008.

References

External links
 Claire Keegan at Aosdána
 [https://www.youtube.com/watch?v=CV1TW1hdaf8 A reading of Foster by Evanna Lynch

1968 births
Living people
21st-century Irish short story writers
21st-century Irish women writers
Alumni of Cardiff University
Aosdána members
Irish women short story writers
People from County Wicklow